Colonel David Hanlin AM (8 December 1928 – 6 June 2001) was an Australian cricketer. He was educated at North Sydney Boys High School, Royal Military College Duntroon and Sydney University.  In the Royal Australia Engineers he became Chief of Works.  His club cricket was with Sydney University. He played three first-class matches for New South Wales between 1948/49 and 1949/50.

See also
 List of New South Wales representative cricketers

References

External links
 

1928 births
2001 deaths
Australian cricketers
New South Wales cricketers
Cricketers from Sydney
People educated at North Sydney Boys High School